Mawer has sometimes been described as a British occupational surname related to another British surname "Mower". However there is no reliable citation or clear origin for this. One argument against a speculated connection with the name "Mower" is that in the days when clerks (amanuenses) wrote what they heard from the illiterate public, they differentiated between Mawer and Mower, i.e. they were probably pronounced differently, even in areas where the same dialect was spoken. 

Another possibility worth researching is that "Mawer" is an Anglicised spelling of Mauer, a fairly common German surname, meaning "wall". If that were indeed the origin of "Mawer", it would explain both the differentiated pronunciation, and the Anglicised spelling.  

The surname Mawer may refer to:

Allen Mawer (1879–1942), English philologist
Barbara Mawer (1936–2006), British scientist
Catherine Mawer (1803–1877), British architectural sculptor
Charles Mawer (born 1839), British architectural sculptor
Gary Mawer (born 1969), Irish sprint canoer
June Knox-Mawer (1930–2006), British writer 
Philip Mawer (born 1947), British civil servant
Robert Mawer (1807–1854), British architectural sculptor
Shaun Mawer (1959–2010), British football player
Simon Mawer (born 1948), British author

See also
Mawer, Saskatchewan
Maver or Mavor, a Scottish surname.
Mawer language, spoken in south-west Chad
 Mawer Group: a group of closely associated 19th-century architectural sculptors working in Leeds, West Yorkshire, England. These were: Robert Mawer, Catherine Mawer, Charles Mawer, William Ingle, Matthew Taylor, Benjamin Payler and Benjamin Burstall.

Surnames of British Isles origin